Sir Robert John Lynn (31 January 1873 – 5 August 1945) was a British Ulster Unionist Party politician. In March 1924 he was knighted.

Parliamentary career 
He was elected as the Member of Parliament (MP) for Belfast Woodvale from 1918 general election to 1922, and when that constituency was abolished for the 1922 general election he was returned for Belfast West, holding the seat until he stood down at the 1929 general election.

At the 1921 Northern Irish general election Lynn was elected as a member of the Parliament of Northern Ireland for Belfast West, holding that seat until it was abolished for the 1929 Northern Irish general election. He was elected for the new North Antrim constituency, and held that seat until 1945. From 1937 to 1944 he was Deputy Speaker of the Northern Ireland House of Commons.

Journalistic career 
Lynn was the editor of the Northern Whig newspaper. He was a leading contributor to educational debates in Northern Ireland though his impartiality is in question, especially following a comment in the Northern Irish House of Commons that Irish language instruction was not worth spending money on. Lynn at first attacked the 1923 education bill for stripping Protestant schools of their denominational character. However, Lord Londonderry—the Education Minister at the time—persuaded him to support the measure making the latter one of the few public proponents of what amounted to nondenominational schooling.

In 1902, the Education Act had been withheld from Ireland at the insistence of Roman Catholic bishops, the result of which was that education reform in Northern Ireland lagged behind that of the rest of the country by 1920. Lynn was asked by the Northern Irish government to look into reforms in education in 1921 and he set up what became known as the Lynn Committee. However, Roman Catholics refused to serve on or cooperate with the committee. Much guidance was therefore required of Roman Catholic Unionist, A. N. Bonaparte Wyse (who later became Permanent Secretary to the Ministry of Education in Northern Ireland).

While Roman Catholic representatives boycotted the committee, Lynn recommended government funding for a separate Roman Catholic education system in Northern Ireland. When the Lynn Committee published its report in 1923, its recommendations were adopted and made law by the Education Bill (NI) of 1923.

On the difficulties of their dealings with the Roman Catholic hierarchy, the Lynn Committee said this in their report:

The Bill was bitterly assailed by both Catholic and Protestant clerics and was subsequently amended so that its original intent disappeared.

References

External links 
 
 

1873 births
1945 deaths
Ulster Unionist Party members of the House of Commons of the United Kingdom
Knights Bachelor
Members of the Parliament of the United Kingdom for Belfast constituencies (1801–1922)
Members of the Parliament of the United Kingdom for Belfast constituencies (since 1922)
UK MPs 1918–1922
UK MPs 1922–1923
UK MPs 1923–1924
UK MPs 1924–1929
Ulster Unionist Party members of the House of Commons of Northern Ireland
Members of the House of Commons of Northern Ireland 1921–1925
Members of the House of Commons of Northern Ireland 1925–1929
Members of the House of Commons of Northern Ireland 1929–1933
Members of the House of Commons of Northern Ireland 1933–1938
Members of the House of Commons of Northern Ireland 1938–1945
Members of the House of Commons of Northern Ireland 1945–1949
Presbyterians from Northern Ireland
Members of the House of Commons of Northern Ireland for County Antrim constituencies
Members of the House of Commons of Northern Ireland for Belfast constituencies